The Conlara River is a river of Argentina.

See also
List of rivers of Argentina

References
 Rand McNally, The New International Atlas, 1993.
  GEOnet Names Server

Rivers of Argentina
Rivers of San Luis Province
Rivers of Córdoba Province,  Argentina